Zbyněk Musiol (born 1 July 1991) is a Czech football player who currently plays for Táborsko. He has represented his country at under-19 level.

References

External links
 
 

Czech footballers
Czech First League players
1991 births
Living people
FC Slovan Liberec players
FK Viktoria Žižkov players
FK Baník Most players
FC Silon Táborsko players
Association football forwards
Sportspeople from Ostrava
Czech Republic youth international footballers